The Angola women's national under-20 football team represents Angola in international youth women's football competitions.

The team competed at the 2022 African U-20 Women's World Cup Qualifying Tournament without qualifying for the 2022 FIFA U-20 Women's World Cup.

See also 
 Angola women's national football team

References 

under-20
African women's national under-20 association football teams